Robert S. "Bob" Light (March 4, 1927 – October 26, 2015) was an American politician who was a Democratic member of the New Mexico House of Representatives from 1985 to 1996. Prior to his House term, he was also commissioner of Eddy County, New Mexico from 1979 to 1982. Light also sat on the boards of Carlsbad National Bank and Carlsbad Bancorporation, Inc.

References

1927 births
2015 deaths
People from Carlsbad, New Mexico
Businesspeople from New Mexico
County commissioners in New Mexico
Democratic Party members of the New Mexico House of Representatives
20th-century American businesspeople